Bigwig is an American punk rock band from New Jersey, formed in 1995. They were originally composed of Josh Farrell (guitar), John Castaldo (bass), Tom Petta (guitar/vocals), and Dan Rominski (drums). 
 
Bigwig have performed with such bands as Pennywise, Less Than Jake, Blink-182, The Ataris, The Vandals, New Found Glory, No Use for a Name, NOFX, The Suicide Machines, Agnostic Front, Lagwagon, and Reel Big Fish. Following the release of their 2001 album Invitation To Tragedy, both Josh Farrell and Tom Petta have received producers credits on several well known albums. Tom Petta has most recently produced the new record entitled For Heaven's Sake by Canadian punk rock band Only Way Back.
 
Their latest album, Reclamation, was released on February 7, 2006, by Fearless Records.

In June 2014, Bigwig performed at Canada's Amnesia Rockfest in Montebello, Quebec and also in September at East Coast Tsunami Fest, Reading, PA.

Members
 Tom Petta (Guitar/vocals)
 Zach Lorinc (Bass)
 Paul Carney (Guitar)
 Rob Ferreira (Drums)

Discography
Studio albums
 UnMerry Melodies (1997)
 Stay Asleep (1999)
 An Invitation to Tragedy (2001)
 Reclamation (2006)

Incomplete list of compilations
Punk Goes Metal (Fearless Records)
The Mongolian Wild Turkey...Vol. 4 (Bad Stain Records)
Punk til ya Pass Out (Bad Stain Records)
Bad Scene, Everyone's Fault: Jawbreaker Tribute (Dying Wish Records)
Short Music For Short People (Fat Wreck Chords)
Punk Chunks
Anarchy in the N.J. (Umbilical Records)

References

External links

Musical groups established in 1995
Musical groups from New Jersey
Fearless Records artists
Hardcore punk groups from New Jersey
Punk rock groups from New Jersey